Nyhavn 15 is a historic townhouse overlooking the Nyhavn Canal in central Copenhagen, Denmark, Europe. The building is listed on the Danish Registry of Protected Buildings and Places. A warehouse in the courtyard has been converted into a hostel.

History

18th century

The site was in the late 17th century part of a larger property, It was by 16899 as No. 20 owned by judge Henrik Ehlers. It was in the new cadastre of 1756 listed as No. 32. The current building was the same year constructed for timber merchant Jens Larsen.

Lars Larsen, Jens Larsen's son, had by 1787 taken over the building. He lived there with his wife Charlotte Friederiche, their 10-year-old daughter Mette Magrethe, the 53-year-old woman Mette Cathrine Bræmer, the 53-year-old widower Wibecke Cathrine Fuscher, the clerk Carl Ludwig Drewsen, a servant, a coachman, a caretaker, a housekeeper and three maids. At the time of the 1787 census, No. 32 was also home to two more households.

The eldest of the three children, Hieronymus Laub (1771-1848), would later become a prominent clergy. The third household consisted of the beer seller Niels Hiorth	 and his wife Anna Christians Datter.

19th century
At the time of the 1801, Lars Larsen resided in the building with his daughter Johanne M. Larsen, his son-in-law Johannes Søbøtker, their two children (aged two and three) and a large staff. All included, the household comprised 21 people. The property was also home to one other household, consisting of beer seller Knud Pedersen, his wife Kirstine Hoskiær	and one maid.

In the new cadastre of 1806, the property was again listed as No. 32. It was by then still owned by  Lars Larsen.

At the time of the 1834 census, No. 32 was home to three households. J. H. Sieveking, a 50-year-old unmarried merchant and consul-general, resided in the building with three employees (two of them married). F.E.Petersen, another merchant, resided on the second floor with his wife 	C.W.Petersen, their three children (aged eight to 21), two office clerks in his firm, two male servants and one maid. Fritz Iversen, a sailor, resided in the basement with his wife Johanne Iversen and a maid.

From 1845 to 1846, the church historian P. F. A. Hammerich lived in the building while working at Trinitatis Church.

In 1870, August Bournonville lived on the second floor.

From 1886 to 1891, the writer and zoologist Vilhelm Bergsøe lived on the second floor. His son Paul Bergsøe's memoirs  (Three Small Windows) describe his childhood home in Nyhavn.

In the 1880s and 1890s, royal actor Poul Reumert grew up in the building as the son of actor Elith Reumert and dancer Athalia Reumert.

20th century

In 1910, the trading company Ørum & Wulf was based in the building. The company was founded on 13 September 1795 by N. N. Ørumin in partnership with a young merchant, Jens Andreas, but it is unclear when it moved to Nyhavn. The company would close in 1912.

The company Henriques & Zøylnerwqas based in the building from before 1919. In 1950, Henriques & Zøylner's Eftf. was still based in the building in 1950. The company was founded by Gustav Aron Henriques (1859-1939) and C. Zøylner (1875-1937) on 1 September 1900.

The engineer Jørgen Koch resided in one of the apartments in the 1940s

From 1950 to 1988, The Maritime Library (Søfartens Bibliotek) was based in the building. It had been founded by the shipping company J. Lauritzen in 1939. The company is now located in Rødovre.

As of 2018, a hostel is located in the rear wing and the side wing houses a restaurant.

Architecture
The building consists of three stories over a high cellar The dormers in the roof were not added until 1942. The facade stands in undressed brick and features three stone reliefs between the first and second floor that commemorates the trade of the property's first owner. The one in the middle features a barge with timber. It is flanked by Neptune with his trifork and Mercury with his winged hat, the gods of the sea and trade.

A gateway in the left side of the building opens to a courtyard surrounded by buildings. To the right is a five bay side wing in three storeys. It was built in two storeys between 1748 and 1756 and heightened with one story before 1801. The three floor high and four bays wide rear wing was also built between 1748 and 1756. There is also a three-story, half-timbered warehouse from before 1756.

The entire complex was listed on the Danish Registry of Protected Buildings and Places in 1918.

Gallery

References

External links

 Bedwood Hostel
 Restaurant Hummer
 Ørum & Wulf
 Source

Listed residential buildings in Copenhagen
Houses completed in 1756
Reliefs in Copenhagen